Australia's Got Talent is an Australian reality television show, based on the original UK series, claiming to find new talent. The fifth season premiered on the Seven Network on 3 May 2011 and ended on 2 August 2011, where singer Jack Vidgen was crowned the winner of Australia's Got Talent, while illusionist Cosentino became runner-up. Judges Dannii Minogue, Kyle Sandilands, and Brian McFadden returned for the series, as well as host Grant Denyer.

The producer auditions took place in 16 cities across Australia, and ran from October to December 2010. The successful acts from these auditions were then invited back for a second audition in front of the judges and a live audience. These auditions were held in February and March 2011 in four major cities, including one day in Gold Coast and Perth, two days in Sydney, and three days in Melbourne. From over 200 successful auditionees, only 48 acts were selected for the semi-finals. The six semi-final shows began on 31 May 2011 and ended on 5 July. Introduced, was a new format to the show where three acts from each semi-final would advance through to the next round. In previous years only two acts have made it through each semi-final.

One of the most notable performances was by Jack Vidgen, a 14-year-old singer who sang a rendition of Whitney Houston's "I Have Nothing" for his audition. His performance earned a standing ovation from both the judges and the audiences, and has received more than 1.5 million views on YouTube. Vidgen has since been dubbed Australia's answer to Justin Bieber, and has also attracted international and local interest. The show had also sparked controversy, with accusations of contestant Jordan Paris plagiarising other comedians' jokes in his audition, and reports of contestant Chooka Parker's incident backstage following his elimination from the show.

Auditions 

The producer auditions took place in 16 cities, throughout New South Wales, Queensland, Tasmania, Victoria, South Australia, Western Australia and the Northern Territory. These auditions began on 17 October 2010 and ended on 12 December 2010. The successful acts from the auditions were then invited to a second audition in front of the judges and a live audience. These auditions began in Gold Coast on 19 February 2011, followed by three days in Melbourne from 25 February 2011. They also took place in Sydney on 12–13 March 2011, and ended in Perth on 20 March 2011.

Semi-finalists

Semi-final summary
 Buzzed out |  Judges' vote | 
 |  |

Semi-final 1

Semi-final 2

Semi-final 3

Semi-final 4

Semi-final 5

Semi-final 6

Notes
 Due to the majority vote for Majestic, Minogue's voting intention was not revealed.
 Due to complications, The Flying Lotahs had to perform outside the studio; the judges were required to be in person to view the performance, and used hand-carried signs in place of their buzzers, though they never used them.

Finals summary 
The "Order" columns lists the order of appearance each act made for every episode.

Final showdown 1 

Notes
1 David De Vitto, Cosentino, and Jack Vidgen were the three acts who won the public vote.
2 The judges then had to choose a fourth act to go through to the grand-final.
Judges' votes (revealed in order) 
McFadden: Ben Price
Minogue: Chooka Parker
Sandilands: Instant Bun

As their votes were a tie, the result went to the public vote. It was then revealed that the act who received the most votes was Ben Price.

Final showdown 2 

Judges' first vote (revealed in order)
McFadden: Matty "The Bandit" White
Minogue: Benchmark
Sandilands: Matty "The Bandit" White

As McFadden and Sandilands both voted for Matty "The Bandit" White, he won the first judges vote.

Judges' second vote (revealed in order)
Sandilands: Benchmark
Minogue: Benchmark

As Sandilands and Minogue both voted for Benchmark, they won the second judges vote. It is unsure who McFadden would have voted for.

Final 

Notes
Vidgen was awarded the grand prize of $250,000.
Guest performers on the grand final decider show were Justice Crew and Jessica Mauboy.

Reception

Controversies 
Comedian Jordan Paris, who made it through to the semi-finals, was accused of plagiarising his jokes in his audition, of which he performed a routine about English singer Robbie Williams. On 26 May 2011, The Gold Coast Bulletin reported that the same routine was performed by English comedian Lee Mack in 2007 on the British stand-up comedy show Live at the Apollo. Paris said he was aware of Mack's work but did not rip off his routine, stating "comedy's a funny thing. Obviously there are a lot of people doing a lot of things, but a joke's a joke. If it's making people laugh then I'm happy." That same day, Brisbane Times also reported that the other half of Paris' routine – about his three requirements for dating a woman – had been lifted from a routine by US comedian Geoff Keith.

After losing the judges' votes in the first final showdown, host Grant Denyer tweeted that Chooka Parker reportedly took the news of his elimination very badly. Parker was reportedly banging windows and doors after losing the grand final spot to dance troupe Instant Bun. He was then warned by studio security before driving off with his parents before the show ended. A spokeswoman for the Seven Network told The Daily Telegraph, "Chooka's family have acquired a TV since he became part of the show and he has understood how the show and fame works since he started... He was upset when Brian said his routine had not developed enough and later went upstairs to the edit suite and blamed them for ruining his performance and he became a bit physical, slamming his hand into a window."

Many of the above cited newspaper stories were grossly exaggerated with Chooka admitting later that although he had been upset it did not happen as the tabloids had argued. Instead Chooka was upset because "The producers took out a crucial part of my song. They pretty much destroyed my piece. I went backstage to ask them why they did it but they wouldn’t listen to me. I just hit the window, I definitely didn’t wrap my hand in a jumper and smash it. I’m not two-faced, what I said on stage I meant. All I want from my music is to make people happy", Chooka said. "You’ve got to hear my music from start to end. By changing it they made it sound as if I had made a mistake. Not winning the show wasn’t too disappointing, winning was never a dream. I just wish they hadn’t cut my song." explains Chooka.
17 year old Bree De Rome continued in her success from AGT 2011 and was managed by Adam Wilkinson (5 Seconds Of Summer)recording her first EP at Studio 31 and distributed By MGM, De Rome made an appearance on various programs including Love Child.

Contestants 

Singer Jack Vidgen, a 14-year-old, appeared on the first episode on 3 May 2011, and performed a rendition of Whitney Houston's "I Have Nothing" for his audition. The performance earned a standing ovation from both the judges and the audiences. Judge Kyle Sandilands said, "You're either gonna be amazing or dreadful – both I will enjoy", while judge Brian McFadden was so moved from the performance he ran up on stage to kiss Vidgen's cheek once it was over. The performance has received more than 3.5 million views on YouTube. Vidgen has since been dubbed Australia's answer to Justin Bieber and has also been inundated with international and local interest. He has also attracted the attention of celebrity gossip blogger Perez Hilton, who has posted several blogs of Vidgen's performances on his website. In late July 2011, it was reported that Vidgen had signed a record deal with Sony Music Australia. Whilst the very popular Chooka Parker did not sign any contract with any record label he has gone on to become a very successful pianist, performing around Australia and has been overseas. Chooka Parker still retains his loveable character and popularity, winning a major music award in the People's Choice category, which enabled him to perform at the Sydney Opera House. He has released two recordings to date, a CD titled "No Worries!" in October 2011, and an EP titled, "My Jewel" in 2012

Ratings 
The first episode on 3 May 2011, achieved an audience of 1,563,000 and placed second overall for the night, being beaten by Masterchef Australia. The second episode saw a slight drop in ratings with 1,457,000 viewers, and placed second once again. The next five episodes each topped the nights overall ratings. The seventh episode reached an audience of 1,815,000, which made Australia's Got Talent the third highest rating program of 2011. The first live semi-final show on 31 May 2011, gained 1,949,000 viewers and topped the nights overall ratings. The ratings boost was credited to 14-year-old singer Jack Vidgen who performed a cover of "And I Am Telling You I'm Not Going" from the Dreamgirls soundtrack. The grand final show on 26 July 2011, achieved an audience of 2,192,000, becoming the season's highest ratings to date. The grand final decider show on 2 August 2011, gained 2,855,000 viewers and topped the nights overall ratings. The ratings were the highest achieved in 2011 so far by a television show broadcast in Australia.

References 

Australia's Got Talent
2011 Australian television seasons